The Cyprus Ports Authority (CPA) is a semi-autonomous government agency that is responsible for the supervision and oversight of the ports and port facilities of Cyprus.  Established by the Cyprus Ports Authority Law of 1973, it is based in Nicosia.

Ports
The ports and oil terminals under the effective control of the CPA are:
 Dekelia Oil Terminal, Dekelia
 Larnaca Oil Terminal, Larnaca
 Larnaca Port, Larnaca (multipurpose)
 Latsi Port, Latsi (leisure)
 New Limassol Port, Limassol (multipurpose)
 Old Limassol Port, Limassol (fishing; leisure)
 Paphos Port, Paphos (passenger; fishing; leisure)
 Vasiliko Oil Terminal, Vasiliko
 Vasiliko Port, Vasiliko (industrial)

The New Limassol Port is the country's principal passenger and cargo port. The ports of Famagusta and Kyrenia and the terminal at Karavostasi lie in Northern Cyprus.

Lighthouses
The lighthouses at Paphos, Cape Greco, Cape Gata and Akamas are under the jurisdiction of the Authority.

See also
 Cyprus Merchant Marine
 Government of Cyprus
 Port authority
 Port operator
 Transport in Cyprus

References

External links
 Cyprus Ports Authority

Port authorities
Ports and harbours of Cyprus
1973 establishments in Cyprus
Government agencies established in 1973
Lighthouse organizations
Government-owned companies of Cyprus
Companies based in Nicosia